The CKW Bridge over Powder River is a Pratt deck truss bridge near Arvada, Wyoming, which carries US 14/US 16 across the Powder River. The bridge was built from 1932 to 1933 by the W. P. Roscoe Company. The  bridge has three continuous main spans and two shallow approach spans. It is the only continuous truss bridge still in use on a Wyoming road and one of only two deck truss bridges built on a major highway.

The bridge was added to the National Register of Historic Places on February 22, 1985. It was one of several bridges added to the NRHP for its role in the history of Wyoming bridge construction.

See also

List of bridges documented by the Historic American Engineering Record in Wyoming

References

External links

Road bridges on the National Register of Historic Places in Wyoming
Bridges completed in 1933
Buildings and structures in Sheridan County, Wyoming
Historic American Engineering Record in Wyoming
National Register of Historic Places in Sheridan County, Wyoming
U.S. Route 14
U.S. Route 16
Bridges of the United States Numbered Highway System
Pratt truss bridges in the United States
Metal bridges in the United States